The MD-82 is a Vietnamese anti-personnel blast mine, that is broadly similar to the United States M14 mine, although the fuzing system is different.

Specifications
 Height: 57 mm
 Diameter: 53 mm
 Weight: 100 g approx
 Explosive content: 28 g TNT
 Activation pressure: 4 to 5 kg

References

 

Anti-personnel mines
Military equipment of Vietnam